Kato Koutrafas is a small village in the Nicosia District of Cyprus, just off the main road linking Astromeritis and Kakopetria.

References

Communities in Nicosia District